

At a glance

Georgia's airports by passenger traffic in 2022

Georgia's airports by passenger traffic in 2021

Georgia's airports by passenger traffic in 2020

Georgia's airports by passenger traffic in 2019

Georgia's airports by passenger traffic in 2018

Georgia's airports by passenger traffic in 2017

Georgia's airports by passenger traffic in 2016

References

Georgia
Busy
Airports, Busy
Georgia
Airports, busiest